New Waves is the tenth studio album by American hip hop group Bone Thugs. It was released on June 23, 2017, by Entertainment One Music. The album only consists of 2 out of 5 members of Bone Thugs-n-Harmony (Krayzie Bone and Bizzy Bone; a duo simply known as "Bone Thugs"). The album features a large selection of guest appearances, including Stephen Marley, Tank, Jesse Rankins, Kaci Brown, Jazze Pha, the other Bone members (Layzie Bone, Wish Bone and Flesh-n-Bone), Jonathan Davis from nu metal band Korn, Bun B, Uncle Murda, Yelawolf, IYAZ, Eric Bellinger and more.

The album's lead single, "Coming Home", was released on March 24, 2017. New Waves debuted at number 181 on the US Billboard 200.

Background
The album features two of the five members of Bone Thugs-n-Harmony (Krayzie Bone and Bizzy Bone) rapping with their "signature fast-rapping, singing style over an array of new sounds, including EDM and pop-tinged beats".

In an interview with AllHipHop.com Krayzie Bone explained the meaning of the album:

Bizzy Bone also spoke on the creation process of the album and why they decided to choose eOne as the record label for the album:

Promotion

Singles
The album's lead single, "Coming Home" featuring Stephen Marley was released on March 24, 2017. The song was produced by Damizza and Dutch producers Avedon & Clifford Golio. The song's accompanying music video was released on May 8, 2017.

The album's second single, titled "If Heaven Had a Cellphone" featuring American R&B singer Tank was released on June 9, 2017 accompanied by a music video. The track is a lyrical follow-up to the Bone Thugs-n-Harmony hit “Crossroads”.

The album's third single, titled "Fantasy" featuring Jesse Rankins was released on June 16, 2017 accompanied by a music video.

Other songs
The music video for "Change the Story" featuring Uncle Murda was released on June 10, 2017. In regards to “Change the Story,” Bizzy said it was important for the group to acknowledge some of the rap legends who've passed on prematurely.

Critical reception

Aaron Mckrell of HipHopDX gave the album a score of 3.7/5 and wrote: "This ain't your daddy’s Bone. Want ominous ivory tickles and creepy basslines? Too bad; you’re getting thumping bass and soaring robo-rhythms."

Track listing 

Notes
  signifies a co-producer
  signifies an additional producer
 "Good Person", "Cocaine Love" and "Bad Dream" contains additional vocals by Kyle and Devin
 "Fantasy" contains additional vocals by Cimo Fränkel
 "Waves" contains additional vocals by Yahusha Kalev
 "Ruthless" contains additional instruments by Wouter Bossen

Charts

Release history

References

2017 albums
Albums produced by Scott Storch
Bone Thugs-n-Harmony albums